is a 2.5D fighting video game created by Konami for the Nintendo 64, released in 1998. The name Rakugakids is a portmanteau of the Japanese word rakugaki (meaning "doodle"), and the English word "kids", a reflection of the visual style of the game which resembled children's drawings.

Gameplay

The game is similar in play to a toned-down Street Fighter. The button layout is the six-buttons fighting game standard consisting primarily of three punches and three kicks, which combine with various directional commands to produce special secondary moves. All characters have a single-button attack that sends the opponent into the air, where they can then be pursued and aerially attacked. Perhaps to complement this, each character can perform an additional jump while in the air.

Super combos in this game are referred to as "Magic" and a player can have up to three levels of Magic which are represented by three crayons that appear at the bottom of the screen. Super Meter levels can be spent in three ways: offense, where an attack causes heavy damage with a few hits; defense, where an attack causes little damage, but sends the opponent far away; and counter, usable only while the character is blocking, causes medium damage and sends the opponent flying away.

Characters
Astronots (アストロノッツ) drawn by Andy (アンディ): A Buck Rogers-like astronaut and the game's protagonist. He fights using assorted pulp-era sci-fi devices like a raygun and rocket boots. He is like the typical Ryu of the game.
Captain. Cat. Kit (キャプテン・キャット・キット) drawn by DDJ: An anthropomorphic cat dressed in hip hop fashion. Fights using brass instruments, a basketball and breakdancing moves. Also has the ability to spontaneously combust at will.
Marsa (マーサ) drawn by Nola (ノーラ): A witch bearing a hat that acts like a chicken. Marsa is the only one who can triple jump, and her 'Marsa Jump' sends her far up off screen. Used strategically, you can avoid danger with it.
Robot C.H.O (ロボット C.H.O.) drawn by Jerry (ジェリー): The game's heavyweight grappler character. A robot who can transform into various metal objects, like a trashcan or a car. The spinning letters on its hand and head will change depending on its actions.
Beartank (ベアタンク) drawn by Clione (クリオネ): A green bear with tank guns on its head and back. It can change its body into a set of tank treads (Leaving only its head exposed.) and fire small copies of itself from either gun. For some reason, it is constantly sleeping. It is the speediest character, the second being Captain. Cat. Kit.
Cools. Roy (クールス・ロイ) drawn by Roy (ロイ): A cowboy-like character, who fights with honor (his taunt is a bow to the opponent).
Mamezo (マメゾ) drawn by Val (バル): a yellow boogeyman-style character with a green cape. His moves are mostly jelly-like transformations into various gadgets and tools (like a fork, an iron, scissors and more) or summon rockets and other things. He is introduced as the main villain in the intro.

Hidden Characters
Inuzo (イヌゾ) drawn by Mudgas: The game's sub-boss character. A palette-swap of Mamezo with a different idle and walking animation but otherwise identical moves.
Darkness (ダークネス) drawn by George: The game's boss character. A ghost dog with various moves involving morphing itself and spawning objects from its body.

Reception 

Its art style was frequently compared to PaRappa the Rapper. Lesser reviews from magazines like Joypad and Player One claimed there was nothing interesting in the gameplay, and that the "crazy universe", combination of comic elements and the fighting genre, and the art style's similarities to PaRappa the Rapper were its only appealing aspects. Player One did appreciate the incorporation of several blows that took advantage of all of the Nintendo 64 controller's buttons, and compared the character animation and quality to that of a title produced by Nintendo. Ultimately, however, he wrote Rakugakids was another fighting game where success was based on the randomness of the effectiveness of moves.

Legacy 
Journalist Steve Merrett cited Konami's Nintendo 64 library as its last set of games that focused on gameplay; games like Rakugakids, International Superstar Soccer 98 (1998), Castlevania (1999), used the Nintendo 64's processing power to add to gameplay tropes previously established in 2D gaming. For Rakugakids, 2D characters fought on a 3D background. The game's formula is also an example of how 2D fighters from companies like Konami, Capcom, and SNK incorporated different methods to stay relevant in a market filled with 3D games.

Related releases 
Some references such as characters and music from Rakugakids were later added to other video games by Konami. In Castlevania: Circle of the Moon, protagonist Nathan Graves can transform into the Beartank character by equipping the Bear Ring and activating the Black Dog and Pluto cards (which normally transforms him into a Skeleton). Beartank, Robot CHO, Mamezo, Marsa, Cools Roy, Captain Cat Kit, Darkness, and Astronauts makes an appearance in Goemon Mononoke Sugoroku. Beartank also appears as a secret character in Konami Krazy Racers. Music from the game also appears in some of Konami's Bemani games, namely Beatmania GB and Pop n' Music.

References

External links

Rakukakids at Hardcore Gaming 101

1998 video games
3D fighting games
Fighting games
Konami games
Multiplayer video games
Nintendo 64 games
Nintendo 64-only games
Video games scored by Kozo Nakamura
Video games with 2.5D graphics
Multiplayer and single-player video games
Video games developed in Japan